The 2009–10 CONCACAF Champions League Championship Round was the eight-team, two-legged knockout round of the 2009–10 CONCACAF Champions League. The round was played in March and April 2010.

Qualified teams 
A total of eight teams participated in the Championship Round. The following teams qualified from the Group Stage:

Bracket 
The championship round draw was conducted on November 17.

Quarterfinals 
The first legs of the Quarterfinals were played the week of March 9, 2010, while the second legs were played the week of March 16, 2010.

|}

First legs

Second legs

Pachuca won 3–2 on aggregate.

Toluca won 5–4 on aggregate.

Cruz Azul won 4–0 on aggregate.

UNAM won 6–3 on aggregate.

Semifinals 
The first legs of the Semifinals were played the week of March 30, 2010, while the second legs were played the week of April 6, 2010.

|}

First legs

Second legs

Cruz Azul won 5–1 on aggregate.

Pachuca won 2–1 on aggregate.

Final 

The first leg of the Final was played on April 21, 2010, while the second leg was played on April 28, 2010.

|}

First leg

Second leg 

2–2 on aggregate. Pachuca won on away goals.

References 

Championship Round